The Finder is the default file manager and graphical user interface shell used on all Macintosh operating systems. Described in its "About" window as "The Macintosh Desktop Experience", it is responsible for the launching of other applications, and for the overall user management of files, disks, and network volumes. It was introduced with the first Macintosh computer, and also exists as part of GS/OS on the Apple IIGS. It was rewritten completely with the release of Mac OS X in 2001.

In a tradition dating back to the Classic Mac OS of the 1980s and 1990s, the Finder icon is the smiling screen of a computer, known as the Happy Mac logo.

Features
The Finder uses a view of the file system that is rendered using a desktop metaphor; that is, the files and folders are represented as appropriate icons. It uses a similar interface to Apple's Safari browser, where the user can click on a folder to move to it and move between locations using "back" and "forward" arrow buttons.  Like Safari, the Finder uses tabs to allow the user to view multiple folders; these tabs can be pulled off the window to make them separate windows. There is a "favorites" sidebar of commonly used and important folders on the left of the Finder window.

The classic Mac OS Finder uses a spatial metaphor quite different from the more browser-like approach of the modern macOS Finder. In the classic Finder, opening a new folder opens the location in a new window: Finder windows are 'locked' so that they would only ever display the contents of one folder. It also allows extensive customization, with the user being able to give folders custom icons matching their content. This approach emphasizes the different locations of files within the operating system, but navigating to a folder nested inside multiple other folders fills the desktop with a large number of windows that the user may not wish to have open. These must then be closed individually. Holding down the option key when opening a folder would also close its parent, but this trick was not discoverable and remained under the purview of power users.

The modern Finder uses macOS graphics APIs to display previews of a range of files, such as images, applications and PDF files. The Quick Look feature allows users to quickly examine documents and images in more detail from the finder by pressing the space bar without opening them in a separate application. The user can choose how to view files, with options such as large icons showing previews of files, a list with details such as date of last creation or modification, a Gallery View (replacing the previous Cover flow in macOS Mojave), and a "column view" influenced by macOS's direct ancestor NeXTSTEP.

The modern Finder displays some aspects of the file system outside its windows. Mounted external volumes and disk image files can be displayed on the desktop.  There is a trash can on the Dock in macOS, to which files can be dragged to mark them for deletion, and to which drives can be dragged for ejection. When a volume icon is being dragged, the Trash icon in the Dock changes to an eject icon in order to indicate this functionality. Finder can record files to optical media on the sidebar.

From Yosemite onwards, the Finder is updated to include a refreshed user interface with updated typography and translucency, along with a new icon. Functionally, it also contains official support for extensions, allowing synchronization and cloud storage applications such as Dropbox to display sync status labels inside the Finder display.

macOS Big Sur introduces a complete graphical redesign of the Finder, along with the rest of the user interface, sporting the removal of the brushed metal interface elements, a full height sidebar and all new iconography. Big Sur also slightly modifies the Finder icon with rounded corners.

Reception
Stewart Alsop II in 1988 said "It is testimony to either the luck or vision of the original designers" of Finder that "the interface has been able to survive tremendous evolution without much essential damage" from 1984. He praised its spatial file manager as "probably a more complete definition of a PC-based universe than any" competitor, with users able to seamlessly use floppies, local and remote hard disks, and large and small file servers. Alsop said that even if Apple had stolen Xerox's technology for Finder, it was now very different. While criticizing the lack of a right mouse button and MultiFinder's clumsiness, he concluded that "Apple remains the king of user interfaces. Finder is the only interface with 1.5 million people sitting in front of it daily. Apple is spending tremendous amounts of money on both development and basic research to remain the leader".

Introducing Mac OS X in 2000, Steve Jobs criticized the original Finder, saying that it "generates a ton of windows, and you get to be the janitor."

Ars Technica columnist John Siracusa has been a long-standing defender of the spatial interface of the classic Mac OS Finder and a critic of the new design. Daring Fireball blog author John Gruber has voiced similar criticisms. In a 2005 interview he said that the Finder in version 10.3 of Mac OS X had become "worse than in 10.0" and that "the fundamental problem with the OS X Finder is that it's trying to support two opposing paradigms at once – the browser metaphor ... and the spatial metaphor from the original Mac Finder ... and it ends up doing neither one very well." Reviewing the same version of Mac OS X, Siracusa comments that the Finder "provides exactly the same self-destructive combination of spatial and browser-style features as all of its Mac OS X predecessors".

Finder replacements
Third-party macOS software developers offer Finder replacements that run as stand-alone applications, such as ForkLift, Path Finder, Xfile, and XtraFinder. These replacements are shareware or freeware and aim to include and supersede the functionality of the Finder. After Mac OS X 10.4 Tiger the UNIX command line file management tools understand resource forks and can be used for management of Mac files.

Timeline
There are minor differences between Finder versions and Classic OS to System 7. From System 6 onward, the version numbers are unified.

Since the introduction of Mac OS X, the largest rewrite of the Finder was with the 2009 release of Mac OS X 10.6, into the Cocoa API, though little change was visible to the user.

See also
 Spatial file manager
 Miller columns
 List of file managers
 Comparison of file managers
 File Explorer

References

External links
 Apple Macintosh before System 7
 Ars Technica: About the Finder...
 Ars Technica: Review of OS X 10.3 – discussing the lack of fundamental changes to the Finder

1984 software
File managers
Macintosh operating systems
Macintosh operating systems user interface